Curiosity (from Latin cūriōsitās, from cūriōsus "careful, diligent, curious", akin to cura "care") is a quality related to inquisitive thinking such as exploration, investigation, and learning, evident by observation in humans and other animals. Curiosity is heavily associated with all aspects of human development, in which derives the process of learning and desire to acquire knowledge and skill.

The term curiosity can also be used to denote the behavior or emotion of being curious, in regard to the desire to gain knowledge or information. Curiosity as a behavior and emotion is attributed over millennia as the driving force behind not only human development, but developments in science, language, and industry.

Causes 

Curiosity can be seen as an innate quality of many different species. It is common to human beings at all ages from infancy through adulthood, and is easy to observe in many other animal species; these include apes, cats, and rodents. Early definitions cite curiosity as a motivated desire for information. This motivational desire has been said to stem from a passion or an appetite for knowledge, information, and understanding.

These traditional ideas of curiosity have recently expanded to look at the difference between perceptual curiosity as the innate exploratory behavior that is present in all animals and epistemic curiosity as the desire for knowledge that is specifically attributed to humans.

Daniel Berlyne recognized three major variables playing a role in evoking curiosity; namely, psychophysical variables, ecological variables, and collative variables. Psychophysical variables correspond to physical intensity, while ecological variables to motivational significance and task relevance. Collative variables are called “collative” because they involve a comparison between different stimuli or features, which may be actually perceived or which may be recalled from memory. Berlyne mentioned four collative variables; namely, novelty, complexity, uncertainty, and conflict. At the same time, he suggested that all collative variables probably involve conflict. Additionally, he considered three variables supplementary to novelty, namely change, surprisingness, and incongruity. Finally, curiosity may not only be aroused by the perception of some stimulus associated with the aforementioned variables ("specific exploration"), but also by a lack of stimulation, out of “boredom” ("diversive exploration").

Curiosity-driven behavior 
Curiosity-driven behavior is often defined as behavior through which knowledge is gained, and should therefore encompass all behaviors that provide access to or increase sensory information. Berlyne divided curiosity-driven behavior into three categories; namely, orienting responses, locomotor exploration, and investigatory responses, or, investigatory manipulation. Previously, Berlyne had already suggested that curiosity also includes verbal activities, such as asking questions, and symbolic activities, consisting of internally fueled mental processes such as thinking ("epistemic exploration").

Theories 
Like other desires and need states that take on an appetitive quality (e.g. food), curiosity is linked with exploratory behavior and experiences of reward. Curiosity can be described as positive emotions and acquiring knowledge; when one's curiosity has been aroused it is considered inherently rewarding and pleasurable. Discovering new information may also be rewarding because it can help reduce undesirable states of uncertainty rather than stimulating interest. Theories have arisen in attempts to further understand this need to rectify states of uncertainty and the desire to participate in pleasurable experiences of exploratory behaviors.

Curiosity-drive theory 
Curiosity-drive theory relates to the undesirable experiences of "uncertainty". The reduction of these unpleasant feelings, in turn, is rewarding. This theory suggests that people desire coherence and understanding in their thought processes. When this coherence is disrupted by something that is unfamiliar, uncertain, or ambiguous, it is curiosity-drive that attempts to gather information and knowledge of the unfamiliar to restore coherent thought processes. Through this theory, the general concept dictates that curiosity is developed strictly out of the desire to make sense of unfamiliar aspects of one's environment through interaction of exploratory behaviors. Once understanding of the unfamiliar has been achieved and coherence has been restored, these behaviors and desires will subside.

Subsets of curiosity-drive theory differ on whether curiosity is a primary or secondary drive and if this curiosity-drive is originated due to one's need to make sense of and regulate their environment or if it is caused by an external stimulus. Causes can range from basic needs that need to be satisfied (e.g. hunger, thirst) to needs in fear induced situations. Each of these subset theories state that whether the need is primary or secondary curiosity is developed from experiences that create a sensation of uncertainty or perceived unpleasantness. Curiosity then acts as a means in which to dispel this uncertainty. By exhibiting curious and exploratory behavior, one is able to gain knowledge of the unfamiliar and thus reduce the state of uncertainty or unpleasantness. This theory, however, does not address the idea that curiosity can often be displayed even in the absence of new or unfamiliar situations. This type of exploratory behavior is common in many species. Take the example of a human toddler who, if bored in his current situation devoid of arousing stimuli, will walk about until something interesting is found. The observation of curiosity even in the absence of novel stimuli pinpoints one of the major shortcomings in the curiosity-drive model.

Optimal-arousal theory 
Optimal-arousal theory developed out of the need to explain the desire for some to seek out opportunities to engage in exploratory behaviors without the presence of uncertain or ambiguous situations. Optimal-arousal theory attempts to explain this aspect of curiosity by suggesting that one can be motivated to maintain a pleasurable sense of arousal through these exploratory behaviors.

The concept of optimal-arousal of curiosity suggests that there is a tendency to maintain an optimal level of arousal. When a stimulus is encountered that is associated with complexity, uncertainty, conflict, or novelty, this will increase arousal, and exploratory behavior is employed to learn about that stimulus and thereby reduce arousal again. In contrast, if the environment is boring and lacks excitement, arousal is reduced and exploratory behavior will be engaged in order to increase information input and stimulation, and thereby increasing arousal again. This theory addresses both curiosity elicited by uncertain or unfamiliar situations and curiosity elicited in the absence of such situations.

Cognitive-consistency theory
Cognitive-consistency theories assume that "when two or more simultaneously active cognitive structures are logically inconsistent, arousal is increased, which activates processes with the expected consequence of increasing consistency and decreasing arousal." Similar to optimal-arousal theory, cognitive-consistency theory suggests that there is a tendency to maintain arousal at a preferred, or expected, level, but it also explicitly links the amount of arousal to the amount of experienced inconsistency between an expected situation and the actually perceived situation. When this inconsistency is small, exploratory behavior triggered by curiosity is employed to gather information with which expectancy can be updated through learning to match perception, thereby reducing inconsistency. This approach puts curiosity in a broader perspective, also involving aggression and fear. That is, if the inconsistency is larger, fear or aggressive behavior may be employed to alter the perception in order to make it match expectancy, depending on the size of the inconsistency as well as the specific context. Aggressive behavior is assumed to alter perception by forcefully manipulating it into matching the expected situation, while uninhibited fear results in fleeing, thereby removing the inconsistent stimulus from the perceptual field and resolving the inconsistency.

Integration of the reward pathway into theory 
Taking into account the shortcomings of both curiosity-drive and optimal-arousal theories, attempts have been made to integrate neurobiological aspects of reward, wanting, and pleasure into a more comprehensive theory for curiosity. Research suggests that the act of wanting and desiring new information directly involves mesolimbic pathways of the brain that directly account for dopamine activation. The use of these pathways and dopamine activation may account for the assigning of value to new information and then interpreting as reward. This aspect of neurobiology can accompany curiosity-drive theory in motivating exploratory behavior.

Role of neurological aspects and structures 
Although the phenomenon of curiosity is widely regarded, its root causes are relatively unknown beyond theory. However, recent studies have provided some insight into the neurological mechanisms that make up what is known as the reward pathway which may impact characteristics associated with curiosity, such as learning, memory, and motivation. Due to the complex nature of curiosity, research that focuses on specific neural processes with these characteristics can help create a better understanding of the phenomenon of curiosity as a whole. The following are characteristics of curiosity and their links to neural aspects that can be thought of as essential in creating exploratory behaviors.

Motivation and reward

The drive to learn new information or perform some action is often initiated by the anticipation of reward. In this way, the concepts of motivation and reward are naturally tied to the notion of curiosity.

This idea of reward is defined as the positive reinforcement of an action that encourages a particular behavior by using the emotional sensations of relief, pleasure, and satisfaction that correlate with happiness. Many areas in the brain are used to process reward and come together to form what is called the reward pathway. In this pathway many neurotransmitters play a role in the activation of the reward sensation, including dopamine, serotonin and opioid chemicals.

Dopamine is linked to the process of curiosity, as it is responsible for assigning and retaining reward values of information gained. Research suggests higher amounts of dopamine is released when the reward is unknown and the stimulus is unfamiliar, compared to activation of dopamine when stimulus is familiar.

Nucleus accumbens 
The nucleus accumbens is a formation of neurons and is important in reward pathway activation. As previously mentioned, the reward pathway is an integral part in the induction of curiosity. The release of dopamine in investigating response to novel or exciting stimuli. The fast dopamine release observed during childhood and adolescence is important in development, as curiosity and exploratory behavior are the largest facilitators of learning during early years.

In addition, the sensation pleasure of "liking" can occur when opioids are released by nucleus accumbens. This helps someone evaluate the unfamiliar situation or environment and attach value to the novel object. These processes of both wanting and liking play a role in activating the reward system of the brain, and perhaps in the stimulation of curious or information-seeking tendencies as well.

Caudate nucleus
The caudate nucleus, is a region of the brain that is highly responsive to dopamine. The caudate nucleus is another component of the reward pathway. Research has suggested that the role of the caudate nucleus is to anticipate the possibility and reward of exploratory behavior and gathered information, thus contributing to factors of curiosity.

Anterior cortices 
Regions of the anterior cortices correspond to both conflict and arousal and, as such, seem to reinforce certain exploratory models of curiosity.

Cortisol 
Cortisol is a chemical known for its role in stress regulation. However, cortisol may also be associated with curious or exploratory behavior. Findings in recent studies suggesting the role of cortisol with curiosity support the idea of optimal arousal theory. It is suggested the release of a small amount cortisol causing stress encourages curious behavior, while too much stress can initiate a "back away" response.

Attention
Attention is important to the understanding of curiosity because it directly correlates with one's abilities to selectively focus and concentrate on particular stimuli in the surrounding environment. As there are limited cognitive and sensory resources to understand and evaluate various stimuli, attention allows the brain to better focus on what it perceives to be the most important or relevant of these stimuli. Individuals tend to focus their energies on stimuli that are particularly stimulating or engaging. Indicating that the more attention a stimulus garners, the more frequent one's energy and focus will be directed towards that stimulus. This idea suggests an individual will focus their attention on new or unfamiliar stimuli in an effort to better understand or make sense of the unknown over the more familiar or repetitive stimuli, creating the idea that curiosity demands attention.

Striatum
The striatum is a part of the brain which coordinates motivation with body movement. It would seem natural that the striatum plays a role in attention and reward anticipation, both of which are important in the provocation of curiosity.

Precuneus 
The precuneus is a region of the brain that is involved in attention, episodic memory, and visuospatial processing. There has been a correlation found between the amount of grey matter in the precuneus and levels of curious and exploratory behaviors; suggesting that the precuneus density has an influence on levels of curiosity.

Memory and learning
Memory plays an important role in the understanding of curiosity. If curiosity is the desire to seek out and understand unfamiliar or novel stimuli, one's memory is important in determining if the stimulus is indeed unfamiliar.

Memory is the process by which the brain can store and access information. In order to determine if the stimulus is novel, an individual must remember if the stimulus has been encountered before. Thus, memory plays an integral role in dictating the level of novelty or unfamiliarity, and the level of need for curiosity.

It can also be suggested that curiosity can affect memory. As previously mentioned, stimuli that are novel tend to capture more of our attention. Additionally, novel stimuli usually have a reward value associated with them, the anticipated reward of what learning that new information may bring. With stronger associations and more attention devoted to a stimulus, it is probable that the memory formed from that stimulus will be longer lasting and easier to recall, both of which facilitate better learning.

Hippocampus and the parahippocampal gyrus
The hippocampus is important in memory formation and recall and therefore instrumental in determining the novelty of various stimuli. Research suggests the hippocampus is involved in generating the underlying motivation to explore for the purpose of learning.

The parahippocampal gyrus (PHG), the area of grey matter surrounding the hippocampus, has recently been implicated in the process of curiosity. This finding suggests that the PHG may be involved in the amplification of curiosity more so than the primary induction of curiosity.

Amygdala 
The amygdala often is associated with emotional processing, particularly for the emotion of fear, as well as memory. It is suggested the amygdala is important in processing emotional reactions towards novel or unexpected stimuli and the induction of exploratory behavior. This implies a potential connection between curiosity levels and the amygdala. However, more research is needed on direct correlation.

Early development 

Jean Piaget is considered to be the most influential child researcher. He argued that babies and children are constantly trying to make sense of their reality and that it contributed to their intellectual development. According to Piaget, children develop hypotheses, conduct experiments and then reassess their hypotheses depending on what they observe. Piaget was the first to closely document children's actions and interpret them as consistent, calculated effort to test and learn about their environment.

There is no universally accepted definition for curiosity in children. Most research on curiosity has been focused on adults and which typically used self-report measures are inappropriate and inapplicable for studying children. Curiosity is mostly thought of as attributable to a mature person and is characterized in young children as a fledgling feature of their outlook on the world.

Exploratory behaviour is commonly observed in children and is associated with their curiosity development. Several studies look at children's curiosity by simply observing their interaction with novel and familiar toys.

There has been evidence found of a relationship between the anxiety children might feel and their curiosity. One study found that object curiosity in 11-year-olds was negatively related to psychological maladjusted so children who exhibit more anxiety in classroom settings engaged in less curious behaviour. It has also been suggested that certain aspects of classroom learning is dependent on curiosity which can be affected by students' anxiety.

Other measures of childhood curiosity have used exploratory behaviour as a basis but differing on how which parts of this behaviour is best to focus on. Some studies have examined children's preference for complexity/the unknown as a basis for their curiosity measure; others have relied on novelty preference as their basis.

Researchers have also looked at the relationship between a child's reaction to surprise and curiosity. It has been suggested that children are further motivated to learn when dealing with uncertainty. It is argued that their reactions to not having their expectations met would fuel their curiosity more than the introduction of a novel or complex object would.

Ethicality
The trait of curiosity has been a subject of interest to philosophers. Curiosity has been recognised as an important intellectual (or ‘epistemic’) virtue, due to the role that it plays in motivating people to acquire knowledge and understanding of the world around them. It has also been suggested to be an important moral virtue, as curiosity can help humans find meaning in their lives and to cultivate a sense of care about others and things in the world. 

Due to its importance, there are debates about the extent to which contemporary societies do an effective job of cultivating the right type of curiosity. 

Some believe that children's curiosity becomes discouraged throughout the process of formal education: "Children are born scientists. From the first ball they send flying to the ant they watch carry a crumb, children use science's tools—enthusiasm, hypotheses, tests, conclusions—to uncover the world's mysteries. But somehow students seem to lose what once came naturally."

Sir Ken Robinson discusses a similar phenomenon in his TED Talk titled "Do schools kill creativity?" When curiosity in young people leads to knowledge-gathering it is widely seen as a positive.

Impact from disease 

Different neurodegenerative diseases or other psychological disorders can affect various characteristics of curiosity, for instance Alzheimer's disease's effects on memory or depression on motivation and reward. Alzheimer's is a neurodegenerative disease that directly affects the capability and capacity for memory. Depression is a mood disorder that is characterized by a lack of interest in one's environment and feelings of sadness or hopelessness. A lack of curiosity for novel stimuli might also be used as a potential predictor for these and other illnesses.

Morbid curiosity

Morbid curiosity exemplifies an aspect of curiosity that can be seen as focused on objects of death, violence, or any other event that may cause harm physically or emotionally.

The idea of morbid curiosity typically is described as having an addictive quality. This addictive aspect of the need to understand or make sense of topics that surround harm, violence or death can be attributed to the idea of one's need to relate unusual and often difficult circumstances to a primary emotion or experience of their own, described as meta-emotions.

Understanding these difficult circumstances dates back to Aristotle in his Poetics, stating, "We enjoy and admire paintings of objects that in themselves would annoy or disgust us."

State and trait curiosity
There are two distinct classifications of types of curiosity: state and trait curiosity. Both types determine whether curiosity comes from within or outside of a person. State curiosity is external such as wondering why things happen for the sake of just curiousness, for example, wondering why most stores open at 8 a.m. This type of curiosity tends to be the most relatable for people on a day-to-day basis since state curiosity relates to high levels of reward. On the other hand, trait curiosity relates to people who are interested in learning. Generally, it could be trying out a new sport or food, or traveling to a new unknown place. One can look at curiosity as the urge that draws people out of their comfort zones and fears as the agent that keeps them within those zones.

Curiosity in artificial intelligence
AI agents can exhibit curiosity through intrinsic motivation, this can be useful for improving the success of an AI agent at various tasks. In artificial intelligence, curiosity is typically defined quantitatively, as the uncertainty the agent has in predicting its own actions given its current state.

In 2019, a study trained AI agents to play video games, but they were rewarded only for curiosity. The agents reliably learned advantageous game behaviors based solely on the curiosity reward.

See also 
 Broaden-and-build
 Interest (emotion)
 Inquiry
 Play (activity)

References

Further reading 
 Edelman, Susan (Spring 1997). "Curiosity and Exploration". California State University, Northridge
 
 

Interest (psychology)
Motivation
Problem solving skills
Psychological attitude
Virtue